Salah Bey ben Mostefa (born 1725 in Izmir, died 1792 in Constantine), was the bey of the Beylik of Constantine in the Deylik of Algiers from 1771 to 1792, and one of the most famous in the province. Salah Bey's governance is marked by a victorious participation against the Invasion of Algiers (1775) during the Spanish-Algerian war (1775-1785) and his works of urban planning in Constantine. An example of remaining construction from his era is Bab El Kantra Bridge.

See also
Salah Bey Viaduct is a cable-stayed bridge that spans the gorge valley of the Rhummel in Constantine, North East Algeria.
Salah Bey Mosque  is a mosque in Annaba, Algeria. It was built between 1791 and 1792.
Salah Bey  is a town and commune in Sétif Province in north-eastern Algeria.

References

 

Algerian people of Turkish descent
Beys of Constantine, Algeria
People from Constantine, Algeria
18th-century Algerian people
Algerian military personnel
1725 births
1792 deaths